Le Luc-Le Cannet Airport  is an airport located at Le Cannet-des-Maures,  east of Le Luc, in the Var department of the Provence-Alpes-Côte d'Azur region in southern France. The airport is open to public air traffic, but has no commercial airline service. It also has military use as part of Base école Général Lejay, a French Army (Armée de Terre) training facility for combat helicopters and various ground equipment.

History 
Le Luc airport was built prior to World War II and was seized by Allied Forces during Operation Dragoon, the Invasion of Southern France in August 1944.  After minimal repairs by the United States Army Air Forces Twelfth Air Force XII Engineer Command, it was turned over for operations use by XII Fighter Command on 22 August.   It was not given an Advanced Landing Ground designation. Known units assigned to the airfield were:

 27th Fighter Group, August 1944, A-36 Apache
 324th Fighter Group, 25 August-2 September 1944, P-47 Thunderbolt

With the combat units moving quickly up into Eastern France, the airport was returned to French civil control on 13 September.

Facilities 

References

External links 
 
 
 

Airports in Provence-Alpes-Côte d'Azur
Airfields of the United States Army Air Forces in France